Palacode  (also known as Palakodu or Palacode) is a panchayat town in Dharmapuri district in the Indian state of Tamil Nadu.

Geography
It has an average elevation of 533 metres (1748 feet).

Demographics
 India census, Palakkodu had a population of 20,959. Males constitute 51% of the population and females 49%. Palakkodu has an average literacy rate of 64%, higher than the national average of 59.5%: male literacy is 70%, and female literacy is 57%. In Palakkodu, 12% of the population is under 6 years of age.

Politics
Palacode constituent assembly sends representative to the state assembly. For Lok Sabha it belongs to Dharmapuri Constituency.

Banks
 State Bank of India
 Indian Bank
 Indian Overseas Bank
 Lakshmi vilas Bank
 Union bank of India
Ujjivan Small finance bank

Colleges and Library
1. Govt polytechnic college palacode was Dharmapuri District Co-op Sugar Mills Polytechnic College, 
2. Govt arts and science college, Palacode
3. Arunachalam arts and science college palacode

Palacode has a public library, located opposite BDO office. It has over 16,000 books and various journals.

Railway
Palacode railway station, 
Marandahalli railway station

Road
1.Palacode bus stand

Notable people
Palakodu is also the birthplace of Kannada actor Uday Kumar.

References

Cities and towns in Dharmapuri district